The 2010 Great Alaska Shootout, was the 32nd Great Alaska Shootout competition, the annual college basketball tournament in Anchorage, Alaska that features colleges from all over the United States. The 2011 event was held from November 24, 2010, through November 27, 2010.

Brackets 
* – Denotes overtime period

Men's

Women's

References

Great Alaska Shootout
Great Alaska Shootout
Great Alaska Shootout
2010 in sports in Alaska
November 2010 sports events in the United States